The Pac-12 Conference Hall of Honor recognizes former athletes and coaches who have made a significant impact to the tradition and heritage of the Pac-12 Conference. Established in 2002, one honoree is selected by each member institution in the conference annually. The inductions occur during the Pac-12 Conference men's basketball tournament. The Hall of Honor was originally limited to men's basketball, until it was opened to other sports in 2018. The conference was named the Pacific-10 before it expanded in the 2011–12 season with Colorado and Utah.

See also
National Collegiate Basketball Hall of Fame

References

External links
Pac-12 Conference 

Hall Of Honor
>
Awards established in 2002
2002 establishments in the United States
Halls of fame in California